Reutericyclin is a bacteriocin produced by the bacterium Lactobacillus reuteri that has potential use as a food preservative. Reutericyclin is a hydrophobic, negatively charged molecule with the molecular formula C20H31NO4. Reutericyclin disrupts the cell membrane of sensitive bacteria by acting as a proton ionophore. Reutericyclin has a broad spectrum of activity against Gram-positive bacteria, but has no effect on Gram-negative bacteria because the lipopolysaccharide (LPS) in the outer membrane of Gram-negative bacteria prevents access by hydrophobic compounds.

References

Bacteriocins
Preservatives